Mick Wilson may refer to:

 Mick Wilson (born 1962), member of English art rock band 10cc
 Mick Wilson, co-founder and past member of British trance group Tilt
 Mick Wilson, co-founder of English post-punk band Acrobats of Desire

See also
 Michael Wilson (disambiguation)